The 1941 SANFL Grand Final was an Australian rules football competition.   beat  100 to 71.

References 

SANFL Grand Finals
SANFL Grand Final, 1941